The Idra is a Kabbalistic work included in printings of the Zohar.

Idra or IDRA may also refer to:

People
 IdrA (Greg "Idra" Field), StarCraft player
 Idra Novey, American novelist, poet, and translator

Other uses
 Insanity Defense Reform Act, a US law
 International Design Resource Awards Competition, for sustainable product design
 IDRA-21, a drug
 Idra Group, manufacturer of the Giga Press